Wilczyska  is a village in the administrative district of Gmina Wola Mysłowska, within Łuków County, Lublin Voivodeship, in eastern Poland.

The village has a population of 370.

References

Wilczyska